Artocarpus odoratissimus is a species of flowering plant in the Moraceae family. It is a commonly called  marang, madang, timadang, terap,  tarap, kiran, green pedalai, or johey oak. It is native to Borneo, Palawan, and Mindanao Island, and is closely related to the jackfruit, cempedak, and breadfruit trees which all belong to the same genus, Artocarpus.

Description
The leaves are 16–50 cm long and 11–28 cm broad, similar to the Breadfruit's, but are a little less lobed. Many trees lose the leaf lobing once mature.

Fruit
As indicated by the scientific name, the fruit has a strong scent, and is considered superior in flavour to both jackfruit and cempedak. The scent reminds some of the durian but is not so intense, and is in the thick skin and not the fruit pulp. The pungent scent (almost chemical like scent) is in the outer rind. The taste has hints of a mild creamy, almost juicy annona-longan like texture with hints of the jackfruit/cempedak taste and there's a mild hint aftertaste (similar to the pungent outer rind, far much milder), and is best when not allowed to ripen thoroughly on the tree.  Those ripened on the tree turn a more brownish color and will eventually fall to the ground and easily split open. 

The appearance of the fruit can be regarded as an intermediate shape between the jackfruit and the breadfruit. It is round to oblong, 15–20 cm long and 13 cm broad, and weighing about 1 kg. The thick rind is covered with soft, broad spines. They become hard and brittle as the fruit matures. When fully mature the expanding arils stretch the outer rind which often appears lumpy, especially if not all seeds were pollinated. The fruit does not fall to the ground until over-ripe. It may be harvested when full size but still firm, and left to ripen until soft.  Fruits change colour to greenish yellow when ripe. The ripe fruit is opened by cutting the rind around, twisting and gently pulling. If overripe they are simply pulled apart.  The interior of the fruit is somewhat similar to the jackfruit's, but the color is white and the flesh is usually softer. The core is relatively large, but there are far fewer "rags" and less non-edible parts. Arils are white and the size of a grape, each containing a 15 × 8 mm seed. Once opened, the fruit should be consumed quickly and nicer when chilled (in a few hours), as it loses flavour rapidly and fruit oxidizes. The seeds are also edible after boiling or roasting.

Cultivation
Artocarpus odoratissimus is cultivated for its fruit in Brunei, Indonesia, Malaysia, the Philippines, southern Thailand and India Tripura. The species is largely grown for local consumption; the short shelf-life of the fruit limits its wider use.

The tree is not cold tolerant (as is the breadfruit). It can grow between latitude 15° north and south, and in coastal regions where temperatures never stay under 7 °C.

Similar fruits
The fruits of Artocarpus sericarpus (known as the peluntan, gumihan, pedalai, or tarap bulu) and Artocarpus sarawakensis (pingan or mountain tarap) are very similar to, and often confused with A. odoratissimus. Both these species are native to the same areas. However, they are still distinguishable based on their appearances when ripe. Artocarpus sericicarpus has hairs, like a large rambutan, and ripens red. Artocarpus sarawakensis is even trickier, because it is the shape of A. odoratissimus, and it is orange.  It has smaller kernel sections.

Uses of tarap wastes 
There are many uses of the leftover tarap peels, stem axis and seeds. The tarap peels were reported as useful material for the removal of colouring agents (such as crystal violet, methyl violet 2B and methylene blue ) from dye wastewater. The tarap stem axis were reported to be used in the removal of Cd (II) and Cu(II).

See also
 Domesticated plants and animals of Austronesia

References

Sources
FAO.org: Under-utilized tropical fruits
Artocarpus odoratissimus Marang/Tarap — with pictures of the fruit

odoratissimus
Tropical fruit
Trees of Borneo
Flora of Mindanao
Flora of Palawan
Trees of the Philippines
Taxa named by Francisco Manuel Blanco